Cochituate State Park is a Massachusetts day-use state park located on Lake Cochituate in the town of Natick.  The park is managed by the Department of Conservation and Recreation.

Activities and amenities
The park offers motor boating, sailing, canoeing, kayaking, windsurfing, fishing, picnicking, and swimming.  The park encompasses three sections of Lake Cochituate called the North, Middle and South lakes with different restrictions applying to each. Boat rentals are available in summer. The scenic Snake Brook Trail is used for hiking and biking year-round. The South Lake is host to Wellesley HS, Wayland HS, and Lincoln-Sudbury HS Sailing Teams from March through May.

References

External links
Cochituate State Park Department of Conservation and Recreation
Friends of Cochituate State Park

Natick, Massachusetts
State parks of Massachusetts
Parks in Middlesex County, Massachusetts